Irakinda is a rural locality (a settlement) in Muysky District, Republic of Buryatia, Russia. The population was 651 as of 2010. There are 8 streets.

Geography 
Irakinda is located 77 km southeast of Taksimo (the district's administrative centre) by road. Taksimo is the nearest rural locality.

References 

Rural localities in Muysky District